László "Laci" Babai (born July 20, 1950, in Budapest) is a Hungarian professor of computer science and mathematics at the University of Chicago. His research focuses on computational complexity theory, algorithms, combinatorics, and finite groups, with an emphasis on the interactions between these fields.

Life
In 1968, Babai won a gold medal at the International Mathematical Olympiad. Babai studied mathematics at Faculty of Science of the Eötvös Loránd University from 1968 to 1973, received a PhD from the Hungarian Academy of Sciences in 1975, and received a DSc from the Hungarian Academy of Sciences in 1984. He held a teaching position at Eötvös Loránd University since 1971; in 1987 he took joint positions as a professor in algebra at Eötvös Loránd and in computer science at the University of Chicago. In 1995, he began a joint appointment in the mathematics department at Chicago and gave up his position at Eötvös Loránd.

Work
He is the author of over 180 academic papers.
His notable accomplishments include the introduction of interactive proof systems, the introduction of the term Las Vegas algorithm, and the introduction of group theoretic methods in graph isomorphism testing. In November 2015, he announced a quasipolynomial time algorithm for the graph isomorphism problem.

He is editor-in-chief of the refereed online journal Theory of Computing. Babai was also involved in the creation of the Budapest Semesters in Mathematics program and first coined the name.

Graph isomorphism in quasipolynomial time 
After announcing the result in 2015,
Babai presented a paper proving that the graph isomorphism problem can be solved in quasi-polynomial time 
in 2016, at the ACM Symposium on Theory of Computing. In response to an error discovered by Harald Helfgott, he posted an update in 2017.

Honors 

In 1988, Babai won the Hungarian State Prize, in 1990 he was elected as a corresponding member of the Hungarian Academy of Sciences, and in 1994 he became a full member. In 1999 the Budapest University of Technology and Economics awarded him an honorary doctorate.

In 1993, Babai was awarded the Gödel Prize together with Shafi Goldwasser, Silvio Micali, Shlomo Moran, and Charles Rackoff, for their papers on interactive proof systems.

In 2015, he was elected a fellow of the American Academy of Arts and Sciences, and won the Knuth Prize.

Babai was an invited speaker at the International Congresses of Mathematicians in Kyoto (1990), Zürich (1994, plenary talk), and Rio de Janeiro (2018).

Sources 
 Professor László Babai's algorithm is next big step in conquering isomorphism in graphs // Published on Nov 20, 2015 Division of the Physical Sciences / The University of Chicago 
 Mathematician claims breakthrough in complexity theory, by Adrian Cho 10 November 2015 17:45 //  Posted in Math, Science AAAS News
 A Quasipolynomial Time Algorithm for Graph Isomorphism: The Details + Background on Graph Isomorphism + The Main Result // Math ∩ Programming. Posted on November 12, 2015, by j2kun
 Landmark Algorithm Breaks 30-Year Impasse, Algorithm Solves Graph Isomorphism in Record Time // Quanta Magazine. By: Erica Klarreich, December 14, 2015
 A Little More on the Graph Isomorphism Algorithm // November 21, 2015, by RJLipton+KWRegan (Ken Regan and Dick Lipton)
 [Ласло] Бабай приблизился к решению «проблемы тысячелетия» // Наука Lenta.ru, 14:48, 20 ноября 2015
 copy from Lenta.ru // texnomaniya.ru, 20 ноября 2015
 Опубликован быстрый алгоритм для задачи изоморфизма графов // Анатолий Ализар, Хабрахабр, 16 декабря в 02:12
 Опубліковано швидкий алгоритм для задачі ізоморфізму графів  // Джерело: Хабрахабр, перекладено 16 грудня 2015, 06:30

References

External links

Personal website.
MathSciNet: "Items authored by Babai, László."
DBLP: László Babai.

1950 births
20th-century Hungarian mathematicians
21st-century Hungarian mathematicians
Hungarian computer scientists
Members of the Hungarian Academy of Sciences
Academic staff of Eötvös Loránd University
Combinatorialists
Theoretical computer scientists
University of Chicago faculty
Gödel Prize laureates
Knuth Prize laureates
Hungarian emigrants to the United States
Living people
International Mathematical Olympiad participants
Fellows of the American Academy of Arts and Sciences
Eötvös Loránd University alumni